Jabal Kandi or Jabalkandi may refer to:
 Jabalkandi, Urmia
 Jabal Kandi, Anzal, Urmia County